Washington Hall may refer to:
 Washington Hall, a museum in Colorado
 Washington Hall (hotel), an antebellum hotel in Atlanta, Georgia
 Washington Hall (University of Notre Dame), Indiana
 Washington Hall (University of Massachusetts, Amherst), a dormitory
 Washingtonian Hall, Endwell, New York
 Washington Hall (New York City), former hotel that served as Federalist Party meeting spot and banquet hall from 1812-1844. Current site of 280 Broadway.
 Washington Hall (Nashville, Tennessee), former residence of American politician Luke Lea
 Washington Hall (Seattle), a historic performance hall and former fraternal hall in Washington

See also
Washington House (disambiguation)
Washington Hotel (disambiguation)
 Washington New Hall, in Tyne and Wear, a house built by Sir Lowthian Bell, 1st Baronet
 Washington Old Hall, in Tyne and Wear

Architectural disambiguation pages